Zion Lutheran Church and Graveyard is a historic church on Rosanna Street in Hummelstown, Pennsylvania, USA.

It was built in 1815 and added to the National Register of Historic Places in 1979.

References

External links
 Owner's website

Churches on the National Register of Historic Places in Pennsylvania
Churches completed in 1815
Churches in Dauphin County, Pennsylvania
National Register of Historic Places in Dauphin County, Pennsylvania